USS Thatcher may refer to:

 , a  launched in 1918.  She was transferred to Canada in 1940 and recommissioned HMCS Niagara (I57). She was decommissioned in 1945 and scrapped the following year.

United States Navy ship names